Dorthe Nors (born 20 May 1970) is a Danish writer. She is the author of Soul, Karate Chop, Mirror, Shoulder, Signal, and Wild Swims.

Background
Nors was born in Herning, Denmark, the youngest of three children. As a child, she enjoyed making up stories that her mother, a teacher and painter, would write down and read back to her. At the age of eleven, she began writing her own stories, poems, and plays.

In 1999, Nors graduated from Aarhus University with a degree in literature and art history.

Career
Before Nors' literary debut in her own name, she worked as a translator of Swedish crime novels, mostly books by author Johan Theorin.

She made her debut in 2002, with the book Soul, published by Samlerens Forlag. Her English-language following began in 2009, when selections from her short story collection Karate Chop were published in English. She became the first Danish writer to have a story published in The New Yorker, when it printed her story "The Heron" in 2013. In 2015, her first short story collection Karate Chop was published in English alongside So Much for That Winter, a joint publication of her novellas Minna Needs Rehearsal Space and Days. Her second collection of short stories Wild Swims was published in English in 2021 by Graywolf Press. 

In 2017, she was nominated for the Man Booker International Prize for her novel Mirror, Shoulder, Signal. Her nonfiction book A Line in the World was a finalist for the 2023 National Book Critics Circle award in autobiography.

Personal life
Nors lived in Copenhagen for several years before moving back to Jutland in 2013.

Bibliography

Nonfiction
 A Line in the World: A Year on the North Sea Coast, Graywolf Press (Minneapolis)

Novels
 Soul, Samlerens Forlag 2001 
 Stormesteren, Samlerens Forlag 2003 
 Ann Lie, 2005 
 Minna mangler et øvelokale, Samlerens Forlag 2013 
 Minna Needs Rehearsal Space, (translated by Misha Hoekstra), Pushkin Press 2017 
 Spejl, skulder, blink, Gyldendal 2015 
 Mirror, Shoulder, Signal, (translated by Misha Hoekstra), Graywolf Press 2018

Short fiction 
Collections
 Hun kommer, Samlerens Forlag 2007
 Dage, Samlerens Forlag 2010 
 Kantslag, Samlerens Forlag 2008 
 Karate Chop, (translated by Martin Aitken), Graywolf Press 2014 
 Kort over Canada, Gyldendal 2018 
 Wild Swims, (translated by Misha Hoekstra), Graywolf Press 2021 
Stories

References

Further reading

External links 

1970 births
Living people
21st-century Danish novelists
21st-century Danish short story writers
21st-century Danish women writers
Danish women novelists
Danish women short story writers
The New Yorker people
People from Herning Municipality